Joseph W. Henkle Sr. (August 29, 1906 – January 25, 1983) was an American politician. He was Lieutenant Governor of Kansas from 1957 to 1961.

References

1906 births
1983 deaths
Kansas Democrats
Lieutenant Governors of Kansas
People from Ponca City, Oklahoma
20th-century American politicians
People from Great Bend, Kansas